Max Schwenger (born 28 April 1992) is a German badminton player, specializing in doubles play. In 2011, he won the silver medal in  boys' doubles and bronze medal in mixed doubles at the 2011 European Junior Badminton Championships.

Achievements

BWF World Junior Championships 
Mixed doubles

European Junior Championships 
Boys' doubles

Mixed doubles

BWF Grand Prix 
The BWF Grand Prix had two levels, the Grand Prix and Grand Prix Gold. It was a series of badminton tournaments sanctioned by the Badminton World Federation (BWF) and played between 2007 and 2017.

Men's doubles

Mixed doubles

  BWF Grand Prix Gold tournament
  BWF Grand Prix tournament

BWF International Challenge/Series 
Men's doubles

Mixed doubles

  BWF International Challenge tournament
  BWF International Series tournament
  BWF Future Series tournament

References

External links 
 

1992 births
Living people
Sportspeople from Middle Franconia
German male badminton players
People from Neustadt (Aisch)-Bad Windsheim